Al-Jaish Sports Club is an Iraqi sports club based in Baghdad. The football team has won the Iraqi Premier League once in its history, back in 1984. For the 2008/09 season Al Jaish will play in the Iraq Division One as they were relegated from the Iraqi Premier League the season before.

Honours

Major
Iraqi Premier League
Winners (1): 1983–84
Runners-up (2): 1986–87, 1987–88
Iraq FA Cup
Winners (2): 1979–80, 1982–83
Runners-up (4): 1978–79, 1986–87, 1990–91, 1994–95

Minor
Al-Qadisiya Championship
Winners (2): 1983, 1984
Marah Halim Cup
Winners (1): 1984
Runners-up (1): 1983
Rovers Cup
Winners (1): 1983
Military Friendship Championship
Winners (1): 1980

Famous head coaches

 Munzir Al-Waaiz
 Hakeem Shaker
 Wojciech Przybylski

References

External links
 Club's page on Goalzz.com

Sport in Baghdad
1974 establishments in Iraq
Military association football clubs
Football clubs in Baghdad